Rose Garden may refer to:

Horticulture
 Rose garden, a garden or park used for growing roses

United States
 All-American Rose Garden, Hattiesburg, Mississippi
 Berkeley Rose Garden, Berkeley, California
 Exposition Park Rose Garden, Los Angeles, California
 The Gardens of the American Rose Center,  Shreveport, Louisiana
 International Rose Test Garden, Portland, Oregon
 Morcom Rose Garden, Oakland, California
 Reinisch Rose Garden and Doran Rock Garden, Topeka, Kansas
 White House Rose Garden (at the President's official residence), Washington, D.C.
 San Jose Municipal Rose Garden, San Jose, California

Elsewhere
 Rose Garden, Coburg, Bavaria, Germany
 Government Rose Garden, Ooty, Tamil Nadu, India
 National Rose Garden, Canberra, Australia
 Parnell Rose Gardens, Parnell, New Zealand
 Rapperswil Rose Gardens, Rapperswil, Switzerland
 Royal National Rose Society Gardens, St Albans, Hertfordshire, United Kingdom
 Wohl Rose Park, Jerusalem, Israel
 Zakir Hussain Rose Garden, Chandigarh, India

Places
 Moda Center (formerly Rose Garden), indoor sports arena in Portland, Oregon, US
 Rose Garden, California, former town
 Rose Garden, San Jose, California, neighborhood
 Royal Thai Air Base Nam Phong, Thailand, nicknamed Rose Garden
 Rose Garden Palace, also known as Rose Garden, an historic property in Dhaka, Bangladesh
 McGill Rose Garden (Charlotte, North Carolina)
 Rose Garden (Chandigarh, Punjab)

Arts and entertainment
 Gulistan of Sa'di, or The Rose Garden, book by Saadi of Shiraz (1259)
 The Rose Garden (film), a 1989 film directed by Fons Rademakers
 "The Rose Garden" (short story), a ghost story by M. R. James

Music
 The Rose Garden (band), American folk rock group
 The Rose Garden (album), a 1968 album by The Rose Garden
 "Rose Garden" (Joe South song), a 1968 song first written by Joe South that became a major crossover hit for Lynn Anderson in 1970
 Rose Garden (Nick Jonas & the Administration song), 2010
 Rose Garden (album), a 1971 album by Lynn Anderson
 "Rose Garden", a song by Rae Morris on the 2018 album Someone Out There
 "Rosegarden Funeral of Sores", 1980 song by John Cale, subsequently recorded by Bauhaus - see "Telegram Sam"

Other uses
 Rosegarden, digital audio workstation software
 Port and Airport Development Strategy or Rose Garden Project, a Hong Kong infrastructure project

See also
 I Never Promised You a Rose Garden (disambiguation)